Scream may refer to:

Screaming, a loud vocalization

Amusement rides
 Scream (Heide Park), a gyro drop tower in Soltau, Germany
 Scream! (ride), a tower ride at Six Flags Fiesta Texas and Six Flags New England
 Scream! (roller coaster), at Six Flags Magic Mountain in California

Arts, entertainment, and media

Fictional characters
 Scream (comics), a fictional character in the Spider-Man comic book series
 Angar the Screamer or Scream, a fictional character in the Marvel Comics universe

Films and television
 Scream, a 1964 Greek noir film directed by Kostas Andritsos
 Scream (1981 film), a slasher film
 Scream (franchise), a series of American horror films
 Scream (1996 film), the first of the series of horror films
 Scream (TV series), a 2015 television adaptation of the film franchise
 Scream (2022 film), the fifth installment of the film series
 Scream (TV channel), a Canadian cable TV channel (2001-2009)

Music

Albums

 Scream (Chad Wackerman album), 2000
 Scream (Chris Cornell album), 2009
 Scream (Michael Jackson album), 2017
 Scream (Melody Club album), 2006
 Scream (Ozzy Osbourne album), 2010
 Scream (Pretty Maids album), 1994
 Scream (Markus Schulz album), 2012
 Scream (Sarah Bettens album), 2005
 Scream (Tokio Hotel album), 2007
 Scream (Tony Martin album), 2005

Songs

 "Scream" (2NE1 song), 2012
 "Scream" (Avenged Sevenfold song), 2008
 "Scream" (Billy Idol song), 2005
 "Scream" (Chris Cornell song), 2008
 "Scream" (Dizzee Rascal song), 2012
 "Scream" (Kelis song), 2010
 "Scream" (Michael Jackson and Janet Jackson song), 1995
 "Scream!" (Misfits song), 1999
 "Scream" (Norther song), 2006
 "Scream" (Sergey Lazarev song), a 2019 song that represented Russia in the Eurovision Song Contest
 "Scream" (Timbaland song), 2007
 "Scream" (Tiësto and John Christian song), 2017
 "Scream" (Tokio Hotel song), 2005
 "Scream" (Usher song), 2012
 "Scream", a song by Adelitas Way from their self-titled album
 "Scream", a song by Artful Dodger
 "Scream", a song by Billy Idol from Devil's Playground
 "Scream", a song by Black Flag from My War
 "Scream", a song by CeeLo Green featured in Despicable Me 2
 "Scream", a song by Collective Soul from Hints Allegations and Things Left Unsaid
 "Scream", a song by Dio from Killing the Dragon
 "Scream", a song by Dreamcatcher
 "Scream", a song from the High School Musical 3: Senior Year film soundtrack
 "Scream", a song by Ima Robot from Ima Robot
 "Scream", a song by In Flames from Come Clarity
 "Scream", a song by Monrose, a B-side of the single "Hot Summer"
 "Scream", a song by Sharon Needles from Taxidermy
 "Scream", a song by Slipknot from Vol. 3: (The Subliminal Verses)
 "Scream", a song by TVXQ from Tree
 "Screaming", a song by Band-Maid, a B-side of the single "Start Over"

Other uses in music
 Scream (band), an American punk band
 Screaming (music), a form of singing

Other uses in arts, entertainment, and media
 Scream (magazine), a British bi-monthly horror magazine
 Scream (Norwegian magazine), a Norwegian hard rock and metal magazine
 Scream! (comics), a British weekly horror comic anthology
 The Scream, a painting by Edvard Munch
 Wilhelm scream, a film and television stock sound effect

Brands and enterprises
 Scream (music club), in Los Angeles, California
 Scream Pubs, a pub chain in the UK

Other uses
 Scream (cipher), a word-based stream cipher

See also

I scream (disambiguation)
Primal Scream (disambiguation)
Screamer (disambiguation)
Screamo, a music genre
The Scream (disambiguation)